Essex Village is a village and census-designated place (CDP) in the town of Essex, Connecticut, in the United States. The population was 2,583 at the 2020 census, out of 6,733 in the entire town of Essex. The government offices of the town are located within the village.

Geography
The village is located in the eastern part of the town, along the banks of the Connecticut River. The census-designated place extends from the border of the town of Old Saybrook in the south to the Deep River town line in the north. The western edge of the CDP runs from north to south along the border of the Canfield-Meadow Woods Nature Preserve; Dennison Road; small portions of the Falls River and Connecticut Routes 154 and 621; the Mud River; the Connecticut Valley Railroad; and Bokum Road. The Route 9 expressway passes through the western part of the CDP, with access from Exit 3.

Demographics
As of the census of 2000, there were 2,573 people, 1,190 households, and 727 families residing in the CDP. The racial makeup of the CDP was 98.29% White, 0.43% African American, 0.08% Native American, 0.51% Asian, 0.12% from other races, and 0.58% from two or more races. Hispanic or Latino of any race were 0.93% of the population.

There were 1,190 households, out of which 21.1% had children under the age of 18 living with them, 55.0% were married couples living together, 4.8% had a female householder with no husband present, and 38.9% were non-families. 34.3% of all households were made up of individuals, and 14.6% had someone living alone who was 65 years of age or older.  The average household size was 2.11 and the average family size was 2.71.

In the CDP, the population was spread out, with 18.0% under the age of 18, 2.9% from 18 to 24, 22.7% from 25 to 44, 34.4% from 45 to 64, and 22.0% who were 65 years of age or older.  The median age was 49 years. For every 100 females, there were 91.9 males.  For every 100 females age 18 and over, there were 88.7 males.

The median income for a household in the CDP was $78,763, and the median income for a family was $109,276. Males had a median income of $68,281 versus $52,889 for females. The per capita income for the CDP was $51,928.  About 1.3% of families and 3.5% of the population were below the poverty line, including 2.9% of those under age 18 and 1.3% of those age 65 or over.

References

Essex, Connecticut
Census-designated places in Middlesex County, Connecticut
Villages in Connecticut
Villages in Middlesex County, Connecticut
Census-designated places in Connecticut